Lindsay Reginald Spencer (1915–1997) was an Australian rugby league player who played in the 1940s. He was a premiership winning forward with St. George.

Playing career
Spencer, originally from Young, New South Wales, played for St. George for two seasons between 1941 and 1942. He won a premiership with St. George as a second-row forward in the 1941 Grand Final. His playing career ended with the 1942 season.

Death
Spencer had been a resident of Hurstville, New South Wales for over 50 years when he died on 16 December 1997.

References

Published sources
 Whiticker, Alan & Hudson, Glen (2006) The Encyclopedia of Rugby League Players, Gavin Allen Publishing, Sydney
 Haddan, Steve (2007) The Finals - 100 Years of National Rugby League Finals, Steve Haddan Publishing, Brisbane

1915 births
1997 deaths
Australian rugby league players
Rugby league props
Rugby league players from Young, New South Wales
St. George Dragons players